Montereale may refer to the following Italian comuni:

Montereale, Abruzzo, in the Province of L'Aquila
Montereale Valcellina, in the Province of Pordenone

it:Montereale